Ross E. Zumwalt (born July 18, 1943) is an American pathologist, focusing in forensic pathology and accreditation of forensic pathology training programs

Zumwalt was teaching at the University of New Mexico and is an Elected Fellow of the American Association for the Advancement of Science.

References

1943 births
Fellows of the American Association for the Advancement of Science
American pathologists
Wabash College alumni
University of Illinois alumni
Living people